Larkin may refer to:

 Larkin (surname)

Buildings and structures
 Larkin Administration Building, a destroyed building of the defunct Larkin Soap Company
 Larkin Terminal Warehouse, original warehouse of the defunct Larkin Soap Company
 Larkin Stadium, a football stadium in Johor Bahru, Malaysia

Business and organizations
 Larkin Aircraft Supply Company, a former Australian aircraft manufacturer
 Larkin Company, a former mail-order company based in Buffalo, New York
 Larkin University, Miami Gardens, Florida
 Philip Larkin Society

Places
 Larkin, Alabama, U.S.
 Larkin, California, U.S.
 Larkin, Johor, Malaysia
 Larkin (state constituency), Johor, Malaysia
 Larkin Charter Township, Michigan
 Larkin Sentral, a bus terminal in Johor Bahru, Malaysia
 Larkin Township, Minnesota

Other uses
 Larkin 25, a former arts festival in Kingston upon Hull, England
 Larkin High School, Elgin, Illinois, U.S.

See also
 Senator Larkin (disambiguation)
 
 Larken
 Larkins (disambiguation)